Todrick is an American reality television series featuring Todrick Hall. The show aired on MTV for eight episodes from August 31 to October 19, 2015.

Cast
 Todrick Hall
 Chester Lockhart
 Nicole "LipstickNick" Faulkner
 Kaley Hatfield
 Vonzell Solomon
 Carlie Craig
 Jenni Thomasson
 Shawn Adeli
 ThurZday Lyons

Guests
 Madison Beer
 Dexter
 GloZell
 Joseph Gordon Levitt
 Shanna Malcolm
 Jenna Marbles
 Aubrey O'Day
 Jillian Rose Reed
 Kelly Rowland

Episodes

Soundtrack

On October 13, 2015 a soundtrack featuring all the original songs from the show alongside commentary tracks was released to digital retailers.

References

External links
 Todrick at MTV.com
 Todrick at IMDb

2010s American reality television series
2015 American television series debuts
2015 American television series endings
MTV reality television series